Răşcani may refer to several villages in Romania:

 Răşcani, a village in Dăneşti Commune, Vaslui County
 Răşcani, a village in Șuletea Commune, Vaslui County

See also
 Rîșcani
 Râșca (disambiguation)